Maria Lanakila Catholic Church is a parish of the Roman Catholic Church of Hawaii in the United States. Located in Lahaina on the island of Maui, the church falls under the jurisdiction of the Diocese of Honolulu and its bishop.  The parish has a mission in Kapalua under the title of the Sacred Hearts of Jesus and Mary. Maria Lanakila means "Victorious Mary", the Hawaiian language equivalent to the English language epithet "Our Lady of Victory", which refers to the Blessed Virgin Mary.

The first Catholic priests arrived on Maui on April 21, 1846. The pastor was Fr. Aubert of the Congregation of the Sacred Hearts of Jesus and Mary. A temporary church was built on the site, with a new structure dedicated September 8, 1858. In 1927–1928 a concrete church was built on the original foundation. The pastor as of 2020 was Missionaries of Faith Father Kuriakose Nadooparambil.
The church is a contributing property of the Lahaina Historic District, designated a National Historic Landmark District on December 29, 1962.
It is located on 712 Wainee Street.

The church appeared in the ABC television series Hart to Hart ("Harts and Palms," Season 3, Episode 14).

References

Roman Catholic Diocese of Honolulu
Churches on the National Register of Historic Places in Hawaii
Roman Catholic churches in Hawaii
Buildings and structures in Maui County, Hawaii
Historic district contributing properties in Hawaii
Lahaina, Hawaii
1846 establishments in Hawaii
Roman Catholic churches completed in 1858
Roman Catholic churches completed in 1928
National Register of Historic Places in Maui County, Hawaii
19th-century Roman Catholic church buildings in the United States
Hawaii Register of Historic Places